An urmahlullu (Sumerian language:  ur-maḫ lu₂-lu₇) is a fictitious and mythological lion-centaur hybrid creatures, that are, quadrupedal felines from the waist down and humanoids from the waist up, have appeared in the folklore and myths of several cultures of antiquity as well as in European art of the Middle Ages and early Renaissance.

Ancient Assyria and Mesopotamian Culture 

The urmahlullu ("untamed lion man") is a mythical ancient Mesopotamian beast with a lion-centaur appearance. It was sometimes depicted as holding a club and wearing a cap of divinity. A guardian spirit, its image was used to ward against various malign demons, including the winged death demon Mukīl rēš lemutti and the lavatory demon Šulak. Statues of Urmahlullu were sometimes placed outside lavatories, such as those in Nineveh's North Palace, or buried on either side of the lavatory door in homes wealthy enough to have lavatories on the premises.

Urmahlullu also appear on Assyrian cylinder seals.

Indus Valley and Harappan Culture 

Urmahlullu also appear in cylinder and square seals found in excavations of the Indus Valley city-state of Kalibangan. In one scene, a researcher describes a lion-centaur goddess wearing a head-dress with a long pendant whose body merges with that of the tiger. This goddess is associated with the later Hindu goddess of war.

Medieval Europe 

At this time known as sagittarius, lion-centaurs appear as grotesques in prayer books, gargoyles in churches, and as aquamanilia. Etienne de Blois, later King Stephen of England, featured sagittaries on his coat of arms and was known as "The Sagittary of London Park."

References 

Mesopotamian legendary creatures
Mythological human hybrids